Angre is a village of Wallonia and district of the municipality of Honnelles, located in the province of Hainaut, Belgium.

Tourist Curiosities 
Located in the forest of Bois d'Angre along the Grande Honnelle river, the Caillou-qui-bique is a 25 m high quartz puddingstone, resembling the shape of a human face.  It is 370 million years old. According to the old popular beliefs, most of these rocks have a diabolical origin, in this case, the Devil's work:

References

External links 

 

Former municipalities of Hainaut (province)